Kelso is a suburb in the City of Townsville, Queensland, Australia.

Geography 
Kelso is the last of three suburbs along Riverway Drive and is the only suburb on Riverway Drive that has homes backing onto the Ross River. It is a fast growing suburb with many residential estates being constructed.

History
Kelso was named after Scottish immigrants, and early settlers, Mary and James Kelso, who had cattle property in 1878 called Laudham Park on Five Head Creek.  To make way for construction of the Ross River Dam in 1970, the Townsville City Council resumed 1620ha of the property's best grazing land.  At its peak, Laudham Park stretched for more than 40,000ha along both banks of the Upper Ross River to the foothills of Mount Stuart and out to the Pinnacles part of Hervey Range. Most of what was Laudham Park is today under water due to the construction  of the dam and the rest is now the suburb of Kelso. The first residential blocks started selling back in 1966.

Kelso State School, Prep to Year 6, opened in 1963.

Population
According to the 2016 census of Population, there were 10,538 people in Kelso.
 Aboriginal and Torres Strait Islander people made up 12.0% of the population. 
 82.4% of people were born in Australia. The next most common countries of birth were England 2.2% and New Zealand 2.2%.   
 88.4% of people spoke only English at home. 
 The most common responses for religion were No Religion 29.1%, Catholic 25.9% and Anglican 17.2%.

Transportation
Kelso is connected to Townsville by the Sunbus Townsville.

References

External links
 

Suburbs of Townsville